The A 21 road is an A-Grade trunk road in Sri Lanka. It connects Kegalle with Karawanella.

The A 21 passes through Moronthota, Bulathkohupitiya and Ruwanwella to reach Karawanella.

References

Highways in Sri Lanka